Gózd may refer to the following places:
Gózd, Lublin Voivodeship (east Poland)
Gózd, Subcarpathian Voivodeship (south-east Poland)
Gózd, Świętokrzyskie Voivodeship (south-central Poland)
Gózd, Garwolin County in Masovian Voivodeship (east-central Poland)
Gózd, Otwock County in Masovian Voivodeship (east-central Poland)
Gózd, Radom County in Masovian Voivodeship (east-central Poland)